Copacabana is the main Bolivian town on the shore of Lake Titicaca. The town has a large 16th-century shrine, the Basilica of Our Lady of Copacabana, dedicated to Our Lady of Copacabana, the patron saint of Bolivia. The town is a tourism destination in Bolivia. It is also known for its trout and quaint atmosphere. Built between Mount Calvario and Mount Niño Calvario, the town has approximately 6,000 inhabitants. Copacabana's religious celebrations, cultural heritage and traditional festivals are well known throughout Bolivia. Boats leave for Isla del Sol, the sacred Inca island, from Copacabana. Copacabana is served by Copacabana Airport.

History 
During the wars of independence, the Basilica of Our Lady of Copacabana was despoiled of most of its rich ornaments and gifts, and ruthless plundering by faithless custodians in the course of political disturbances has further contributed to impoverish it. The edifices, originally very handsome, are in a state of sad neglect. It is a shrine for pilgrims from Bolivia and southern Peru, and on 6 August, the feast of its patron saint, it is attended by thousands.

Before 1534, Copacabana was an outpost of Inca occupation among dozens of other sites in Bolivia. The Incas held it as the key to the very ancient shrine and oracle on the Island of Titicaca, which they had adopted as a place of worship, adopting the veneration with which it was held by the Aymaras from time  immemorial. At Copacabana, there were  minor shrines in which the ceremonies of the Incas were observed along with those of the original inhabitants. When the Spaniards first visited the Islands of Titicaca and Loati, in 1534 and 1538, the Andean Cosmovision were abandoned and the Dominicans made Copacabana the centre of their missions. Non-monastic priests then replaced them at the instigation of the Viceroy Francisco de Toledo, and finally the mission and its annexes were entrusted to the Augustinians in 1589.

In 1582, the grandson of Inca ruler Manco Kapac, struck by the sight of the statues of the Blessed Virgin which he saw in some of the churches at La Paz, tried to make one himself, and after many failures, succeeded in producing one of excellent quality, and it was placed at Copacabana as the statue of the tutelar protectress of the community. Many miracles have been attributed to it, and its fame has spread far beyond the limits of its surroundings to all five continents. It is kept in a special chapel, where local Aymaras, Bolivians and those from all over the world are untiring in their devotions.

During the Great Indigenous Uprising of 1781, while the church itself was desecrated, the "Camarin", as the chapel is called, remained untouched and exempt from spoiling. Copacabana is the scene of often boisterous indigenous celebrations. On 2 February and 6 August, Church festivals are celebrated with indigenous dances that the clergy have not been able to suppress entirely. Copacabana is surrounded by pre-Columbian ruins of considerable interest.

Climate
Copacabana has a dry-winter subpolar oceanic climate (Cwb), a rare variant of this type of climate, but commonplace near most of Lake Titicaca. Similar to many areas with this climate, Copacabana features a markedly drier “low-sun” season. Because of the high altitude of Copacabana, the town is chilly throughout the course of the year. However, due to the fact that Copacabana is located in the tropics, there are only slight variations in temperatures. While daytime temperatures hover around  throughout the year, nighttime temperatures during the ”low-sun” season are somewhat cooler than at other times of the year. It is not uncommon for temperatures to drop below freezing during the “low-sun” season.

Gallery

Places of interest 
 Chinkana
 Iñaq Uyu
 Pachat'aqa

References

External links 

Weather in Copacabana

 Bolivia Weekly Bolivia News
Lake Titicaca travel guide

Populated places in La Paz Department (Bolivia)
Populated places on Lake Titicaca
Populated lakeshore places in Bolivia